The Florida State Seminoles baseball team represents Florida State University (variously Florida State or FSU) in the sport of college baseball. Florida State competes in NCAA Division I, and the Atlantic Division of the Atlantic Coast Conference (ACC).

The Seminoles rank sixth in all-time number of total wins and second in post-season wins. The Seminoles have appeared in the NCAA Tournament 59 times, advancing to the College World Series 23 times — and have appeared in the CWS Championship Game or Championship Series on three occasions (1970, 1986, and 1999). Florida State has won 11 regular-season conference championships and 20 conference tournament championships, including nine regular-season ACC championships and eight ACC tournament championships.

Florida State has had 100 All-Americans and 62 players that went on to play Major League Baseball. Former Seminoles who have gone on to have success include Randy Choate, J. D. Drew, Stephen Drew, Ron Fraser, Johnny Grubb, Terry Kennedy, Doug Mientkiewicz, Shane Robinson, Larry Rothschild,  Tony La Russa, Paul Sorrento, Kevin Cash, Woody Woodward, and Jameis Winston. The Buster Posey National Collegiate Catcher of the Year Award, presented annually to the top catcher in college baseball, is named for Florida State hall of famer Buster Posey. Former head coach Mike Martin is the winningest coach in the history of college baseball.

The Seminoles play their home games on campus at Mike Martin Field at Dick Howser Stadium on the university's Tallahassee, Florida, campus and are coached by Link Jarrett.

Program history
Seminole baseball is one of the most successful collegiate baseball programs in the United States having been to 23 College World Series in 59 Tournament appearances, and having appeared in the national championship final on three occasions (falling to the USC Trojans in 1970, the Arizona Wildcats in 1986, and the Miami Hurricanes in 1999).

While under the command of head coach #11 Mike Martin (FSU alumnus, 1966), Florida State became the winningest program in the history of college baseball. Since 1990, FSU has had more 50 win seasons, hosted more NCAA Tournaments, and finished in the top 10 more than any team in the nation. Since 2000, FSU has been one of the best programs in college baseball with more victories and a higher winning percentage in the regular season than any other school. FSU has made the postseason 44 years in a row. FSU also has two 60 win seasons and twenty-four 50 win seasons. FSU has hosted more Super Regional Tournaments than any team in the nation. In 2012, FSU passed Texas for the most all-time wins in regionals and super regionals. In 2014, FSU set the record for the most National Seed selections of all-time. In 2017, FSU defeated Cal-State Fullerton, in the 1000th College World Series game. FSU has never had a losing season in its history; there is no other team at any level of college baseball that has never had a losing season.

Early history (1948–1980)
The first coach of the Florida State Seminoles was Charlie Armstrong, who spent four years with the program and compiled a record of 46–29.

Ralph Matherly became the second coach of the Seminoles. Matherly served as head coach for three years and compiled a record of 43–22–1.
 
Danny Litwhiler was named as the third coach at Florida State. Litwhiler spent nine years coaching the Seminoles and compiled a record of 189–83. He is the second longest tenured coach in the history of the Florida State program.

The fourth coach of Florida State was Fred Hatfield. Hatfield was coach of the Seminoles for five years, and he compiled a record of 157–57–1.

Jack Stallings spent six years as head coach at Florida State. Stallings compiled a record of 248–107–3, making him the second winningest coach at the school.

As the sixth coach of the Seminoles, Woody Woodward led Florida State to an overall record 174–57 in his four years spent as head coach.

Dick Howser returned to his alma mater to serve as head coach of the Florida State Seminoles for one year and guided the team to a 43–17–1 record.

Mike Martin years (1980–2022)

Mike Martin Sr. era (1980–2019)

Mike Martin was the coach of the Seminoles for 40 years after serving as an assistant for five years. He is the winningest coach in school history and his teams never won less than 40 games a season and reached the postseason in every year of his tenure, advancing to the world series on 17 occasions; in 2017, Martin won his 1900th game, becoming just the second coach in college baseball history to reach that milestone, in 2018, he become the winningest coach in college baseball, and in his final season, he became the first coach in history to win 2,000 games. During his tenure, he had 85 players drafted in the first ten rounds of the MLB Draft including 19 first round picks.

Mike Martin Jr. era (2020–2022)
On June 21, 2019, Mike Martin Jr., a former player and assistant, was named head coach of the Seminoles. He guided Florida State to two appearances in the NCAA tournament during his tenure although the Seminoles were eliminated in the regionals on both occasions. On June 10, 2022, Martin was let go following three seasons, ending forty-three years of a Martin at the helm of the program.

Link Jarrett era (2023–present)

On June 24, 2022, Link Jarrett, a former player under Martin Sr., was named head coach of the Seminoles.

Venue

Mike Martin Field at Dick Howser Stadium

Mike Martin Field at Dick Howser Stadium is the home of the Seminoles and is located in Tallahassee, Florida, on the campus of Florida State University. It is primarily used for baseball, and is the home field of the Florida State Seminoles baseball team. It opened in 1983 and after a two-year, $12 million project was completed in 2004 to make it one of the top collegiate baseball facilities in the United States, upgrading the stadium to a 6,700 capacity level. FSU's record crowd of 6,789 was set on April 19, 2008 with a defeat of then #1 Miami Hurricanes by a score of 9–5.

Head coaches
Records are through the 2022 season

*^4 wins were vacated due to the academic scandal in 2007.

Current coaching staff
Head coach: Link Jarrett
Assistant coach: Brad Vanderglas
Pitching coach: Chuck Ristano
Hitting coach/Recruiting coordinator: Rich Wallace

Traditions

Animals of Section B
Before the home half of the 5th inning, a group of fans known as 'The Animals of Section B', lead the Seminoles crowd in singing the Canadian national anthem, O Canada. This tradition is claimed to have started on February 13, 1988, during the 1988 Winter Olympics in Calgary, when FSU was playing Grambling State University.  During the bottom of the 5th inning, with the score tied 2–2, a member of The Animals began humming the Canadian anthem. As the Seminoles began to rally for more and more runs, more Animals joined in the humming and the team scored eight runs that inning.  With baseball being a sport with a long history of superstition, The Animals have maintained the tradition ever since.

Sunday Golds
 
A tradition that began during the Mike Martin era, the Seminoles wear their gold uniforms for every game that they play on a Sunday.

Records and results

Year-by-year results

Note: W = Wins, L = Losses, T = Ties, C = Conference

*^4 total wins vacated due to the academic scandal
*^3 ACC wins vacated due to the academic scandal

Polls
Florida State been ranked in the Collegiate Baseball Division I Final Poll 54 times as of the end of the 2021 season.

Top-10 finishes are colored ██

|}

All-time record vs. ACC teams
Florida State baseball maintains a winning record against all current ACC teams.

*^3 ACC wins are vacated from 2007 due to the academic scandal

Rivalries

Florida State in the NCAA tournament

Florida State has appeared in the NCAA tournament a total of 59 times the second most appearances of any team in history, including 44 straight appearances, the longest active streak and tied for the longest streak in tournament history. The Seminoles have hosted regionals a nation-leading total of 35 times, including eight consecutive times from 2011–2018, have been selected as a national seed a total of 11 times, the most of any school, and have advanced to a super-regional a nation-leading total of 17 times, including six straight appearances from 2008–2013.

The NCAA Division I baseball tournament started in 1947.
The format of the tournament has changed through the years.

College World Series
Florida State has made twenty-three appearances in the College World Series, compiling a 30–46 record and advancing to the title game on three occasions.

Championships

National Championship appearances
Florida State has appeared in the College World Series National Championship game three times in 1970, 1986 and 1999.

Divisional Championships

Conference Regular Season Championships

Conference Tournament Championships

Awards

Dick Howser Trophy

Golden Spikes Award

National Awards 
Johnny Bench Award – Buster Posey (2008), Matheu Nelson (2021)
Brooks Wallace Award – Buster Posey (2008)
America Baseball Coaches Association National Player of the Year – J. D. Drew (1997), Buster Posey (2008), James Ramsey (2012)
Collegiate Baseball National Player of the Year Award – Terry Kennedy (1977), Mike Fuentes (1981), Jeff Ledbetter (1982), Mike Loynd (1986), J. D. Drew (1997), Shane Robinson (2005), Tony Thomas, Jr. (2007), Buster Posey (2008)
National Rookie of the Year – Matt Diaz (1998), Blair Varnes (1999), Stephen Drew (2002), Sean Gilmartin (2009)
John Olerud Two-Way Player of the Year – Mike McGee (2010)
Rawlings Gold Glove Award – Buster Posey (2008), Tyler Holt (2009), Sherman Johnson (2012)
Lowe's Senior CLASS Award – James Ramsey (2012)
Baseball America's National Coach of the Year – Mike Martin (2012, 2019)
Perfect Game/Rawlings National Coach of the Year - Mike Martin (2019)
Perfect Game Player of the Year: Matheu Nelson (2021)

Conference awards
ACC Player of the Year – J. D. Drew (1997), Marshall McDougall (1999), John-Ford Griffin (2001), Tony Thomas, Jr. (2007), Buster Posey (2008), James Ramsey (2012), D. J. Stewart (2014), Matheu Nelson (2021)
ACC Pitcher of the Year – Bryan Henry (2007), Parker Messick (2021)
ACC Freshman of the Year – Jonathan Johnson (1993), Stephen Drew (2002), Parker Messick (2021)
ACC Coach of the Year – Mike Martin  (1996, 1998, 1999, 2001, 2007, 2009, 2012)

All-Americans

Luis Alicea
Mike Augustine
Roger Bailey
Ryan Barthelemy
Robert Benincasa
Allen Bevis
Barry Blackwell
Guillermo Bonilla
Jayce Boyd
Dylan Busby
Jim Busby
Brian Busch
Stephen Cardullo
Kevin Cash
Ron Cash
Tyler Chambliss
Chris Chavez
Randy Choate
Bob Clem
Mike Compton
Tom Cook
Brian Cox
Wes Crawford
Daniel Davidson
Randy Davidson
Matt Diaz
J. D. Drew
Stephen Drew
Jack Dull
Matt Fairel
Frank Fazzini
Jaime Ferrer
Bien Figueroa
Gar Finnvold
J.C. Flowers
Mike Fuentes
Ed Fulton
Sean Gilmartin
Dick Gold
Richard Gonzalez
Brad Gregory
Rick Gremillion
John-Ford Griffin
Pedro Grifol
Brett Groves
Johnny Grubb
Mark Hallberg
Bryan Henry
Daniel Hodges
Tyler Holt
Tyler Holton
Dick Howser
Bryce Hubbart
Link Jarrett
Jonathan Johnson
Terry Kennedy
Ricky Kimball
Jeff Ledbetter
Brandon Leibrandt
Richie Lewis
John LiBrandi
Doug Little
Mickey Lopez
Mike Loynd
Matt Lynch
Jim Lyttle
Ryne Malone
Mike Martin Jr.
Robby Martin
Tyler Martin
Eddy Martinez-Esteve
Blane McDonald
Jon McDonald
Marshall McDougall
Mike McGee
Drew Mendoza
Parker Messick
Doug Mientkiewicz
Scooby Morgan
Jeremy Morris
Mat Nelson
Dick Nichols
Danny O'Brien
Pat Osburn
Drew Parrish
Geoff Parker
Craig Patterson
Eduardo Pérez
Trent Peterson
Buster Posey
Jeff Probst
Cal Raleigh
James Ramsey
Ray Revak
Tony Richie
Chris Roberts
Shane Robinson
Marc Ronan
Jack Rye
Jeremy Salazar
John Sansone
Mark Sauls
Brian Schultz
Jonah Scolaro 
Scott Sitz
Chris Smith
Paul Sorrento
Gary Sprague
D.J. Stewart
Jason Stidham
Nick Stocks
Billy Strode
Ken Suarez
Stuart Tapley
Bud Teagle
Steve Tebbetts
Tony Thomas, Jr.
Devon Travis
Blair Varnes
C.J. Van Eyk
Taylor Walls
Jim Weaver
Luke Weaver
Conner Whittaker 
Paul Wilson
Woody Woodward
David Yocum
Scott Zech

Notable players

Current professional players

Drafted players

Hall of Fame inductees

Two FSU players and one coach have been inducted into the College Baseball Hall of Fame.

Retired jerseys

Notable former players

See also
Florida State Seminoles
Florida State Seminoles softball
History of Florida State University
List of Florida State University professional athletes

References

External links

 

 
Baseball teams established in 1948
1948 establishments in Florida